The Minahassa ranee mouse (Haeromys minahassae) is a species of rodent in the family Muridae.
It is found only on the island of Sulawesi (Indonesia).

References

Rats of Asia
Haeromys
Endemic fauna of Indonesia
Rodents of Indonesia
Vulnerable fauna of Asia
Mammals described in 1896
Taxa named by Oldfield Thomas
Taxonomy articles created by Polbot